Eogystia sibirica is a moth in the family Cossidae. It is found in north-eastern Russia, Mongolia and northern China.

Subspecies
Eogystia sibirica sibirica
Eogystia sibirica krusheki Yakovlev, 2007 (Mongolia)

References

, 1990: A Phylogenetic study on Cossidae (Lepidoptera: Ditrysia) based on external adult morphology. Zoologische Verhandelingen 263: 1-295. Full article: .

External links
Natural History Museum Lepidoptera generic names catalog

Cossinae
Moths described in 1895
Moths of Asia